James Blake "Jamie" Richards (born 2 March 1957) is a cyclist from New Zealand.

Richards was born in Pukekohe, Auckland, in 1957. Mike Richards is his younger brother.

Richards competed in the individual road race event at the 1976 Summer Olympics; he did not finish the race.

References 

 Black Gold by Ron Palenski (2008, 2004 New Zealand Sports Hall of Fame, Dunedin) p. 78

External links 
 

1957 births
Living people
New Zealand male cyclists
Olympic cyclists of New Zealand
Cyclists at the 1976 Summer Olympics
Sportspeople from the Auckland Region